Mezzelune, also known as Schlutzkrapfen in South Tyrol, Tyrol, and neighbouring German-speaking regions and as crafuncins or cajincì in Ladin-speaking regions, are a semi-circular stuffed pasta, similar to ravioli or pierogi. The dough is usually made of white flour or buckwheat flour, durum semolina, mixed with eggs and olive oil. Typical fillings may include cheese (such as ricotta, quark, mozzarella, or Bitto), spinach, or mushrooms (such as porcini, chanterelles, or champignons). There are also recipes with potato, meat, red beet, or sauerkraut filling. The dish may be served with mushroom or pesto sauce, with salsiccia, with seafood, and/or with cherry tomatoes.

Similar dishes
Similar types of pasta are known as casunziei in Dolomites area, casoncelli in Lombardy, and cjarsons in Friuli.

See also
 Mezzaluna
 List of buckwheat dishes
 List of stuffed dishes

References

Types of pasta
Austrian cuisine
Cuisine of South Tyrol
Pasta dishes
Stuffed dishes
Buckwheat dishes